Serge Cardin (born July 2, 1950) is a Quebec politician. He was a Parti Québécois member of the National Assembly of Quebec for the Sherbrooke electoral district from 2012 to 2014, and was formerly a Bloc Québécois Member of Parliament for the federal riding of Sherbrooke from 1998 to 2011.

In the 2011 Canadian federal election, he lost his seat to Pierre-Luc Dusseault, then a 19-year-old university student and the youngest MP ever elected in Canadian history. In the 2012 Quebec election, he unseated the incumbent Premier of Quebec Jean Charest who was also his predecessor for the federal riding.

Born in Sherbrooke, Quebec, Cardin is an accountant. He was a city councillor in Sherbrooke from 1986 to 1998.

Electoral record

* Result compared to Action démocratique

Source: Elections Canada

 
	

						
Note: Conservative vote is compared to the total of the Canadian Alliance vote and Progressive Conservative vote in 2000 election.

External links
 How'd They Vote?: Serge Cardin's voting history and quotes
 

1950 births
Bloc Québécois MPs
French Quebecers
Living people
Members of the House of Commons of Canada from Quebec
Parti Québécois MNAs
Sherbrooke city councillors
21st-century Canadian politicians